Aatef Jenyat (born 8 May 1986 in Homs, Syria) is a Syrian footballer who is currently a free agent, and is a former member of the Syria national football team.

Career

Club career 
Jenyat's career began in the youth system of Al-Karamah before starting his professional career with the senior team in 2004. He won with Al-Karamah four Syrian Premier League titles, four Syrian Cups, one Super Cup and helped the club reach the final of the AFC Champions League for the first time. Al-Karamah were defeated 3–2 on aggregate in the final by Jeonbuk Hyundai Motors of the K-League. Three years later, he was an important factor in his side's first-ever accession to AFC Cup Final. Al-Karamah were defeated 2–1 in the final of the second most important association cup in Asia by Kuwait SC of the Kuwaiti Premier League. In October 2010, Jenyat signed a contract with Syrian League club Tishreen but after six months the contract has been dissolved. In June 2011, he moved to Jordan Premier League club Shabab Al Ordon on a one-year deal, but after five months the contract has been dissolved. On 25 February 2012, Jenyat moved to Iraqi Premier League club Najaf FC.

International career 
Jenyat was a part of the Syrian Under-19 national team that finished in Fourth place in the 2004 AFC U-19 Championship in Malaysia and he was a part of the Syrian U-20 national team in the 2005 FIFA U-20 World Cup in the Netherlands.
He plays against Canada and Colombia in the group-stage of the FIFA U-20 World Cup and against Brazil in the Round of 16.

International goals 
Scores and results table. Syria's goal tally first:

|}

Honour and Titles

Club 
Al-Karamah
 Syrian Premier League: 2005–06, 2006–07, 2007–08, 2008–09
 Syrian Cup: 2006–07, 2007–08, 2008–09, 2009–2010
 Syrian Super Cup: 2008
 AFC Champions League Runner-up: 2006
 AFC Cup Runner-up: 2009

National Team 
 AFC U-19 Championship 2004: Fourth place
 FIFA U-20 World Cup 2005: Round of 16
 Nehru Cup: 2007 Runner-up

References

External links 
 

1984 births
Living people
Sportspeople from Homs
Syrian footballers
Association football defenders
Syria international footballers
Syrian expatriate footballers
Expatriate footballers in Jordan
Syrian expatriate sportspeople in Jordan
Expatriate footballers in Iraq
Syrian expatriate sportspeople in Iraq
Al-Karamah players
Tishreen SC players
Shabab Al-Ordon Club players
Najaf FC players
Footballers at the 2006 Asian Games
Asian Games competitors for Syria
Syrian Premier League players